The Declaration of Independence was a document adopted by Dáil Éireann, the revolutionary parliament of the Irish Republic, at its first meeting in the Mansion House, Dublin, on 21 January 1919. It followed from the Sinn Féin election manifesto of December 1918. Texts of the declaration were adopted in three languages: Irish, English and French.

Scope
The Irish Republic claimed jurisdiction over the whole island of Ireland. The declaration made no mention of the independence of the 32-county geographic island, just the independence of the "Irish nation" or "Irish people". It was rivalled by the British administration of the Lord Lieutenant of Ireland, but as the Irish War of Independence went on, it increased its legitimacy in the eyes of most Irish people. It was taken over by the Irish Free State in 1922, after the Anglo-Irish Treaty.

Under international law, the declaration satisfied the principle of the "declarative theory of statehood," but in 1919 almost all states followed the "constitutive theory of statehood" and therefore did not recognise the Irish Republic.

Ratification of 1916 Proclamation
By the Declaration of Independence, the Dáil ratified the earlier Proclamation of the Irish Republic of Easter 1916. This proclamation had not been adopted by an elected body but merely by the Easter rebels claiming to act in the name of the Irish people. Unlike the proclamation, the Declaration of Independence was followed by the establishment of some de facto political organs. In its crucial line the declaration pronounced that:

English garrison

Differing meanings were given to the occupying 'English garrison'. This was the closest that the Irish Republic came to declaring war on Britain in January 1919, arguing that an invasion had taken place, and therefore any military action from then on was to remove the invaders. The government in London refused to take this as a declaration of war, considering that it was worded for an Irish audience. When the Irish War of Independence started with some  haphazard shootings on the same day at Soloheadbeg, County Tipperary, it was treated by the British as a police matter. The Dáil had no claim to control the Irish Republican Army (IRA) until they swore an oath of allegiance to it in August 1920.

700 years

This was based on the 'apostolic succession' of revolts against the English and later, British Administrations, placing the last fully free Ireland in the Gaelic world of about the 1160s, before the Anglo-Norman invasion of Ireland of 1168–71. The declaration saw the wars and revolts of 1594–1603, 1641–50, 1689–91, 1798, 1803, 1848, 1867 and 1916 as a continuing attempt at regaining Irish self-government, with or without links to the crown.

Aim of international recognition

An important element in the 1918 Sinn Féin election manifesto was to secure recognition at the forthcoming peace conference that would end the World War of 1914 to 1918. President Woodrow Wilson of the United States had suggested that the Versailles Peace Conference would be inclusive and even-handed, but his "Fourteen Points" had called for "equal weight" between parties at arbitration in article 5, and not outright declarations of independence.

In June 1920, a "Draft Treaty between the new Russian Soviet Federative Socialist Republic and the Republic of Ireland" was circulated in Dublin. E. H. Carr, the historian of early Bolshevism, considered that ".. the negotiations were not taken very seriously on either side." The RSFSR was a pariah state at the time.

See also

On the same day the First Dáil adopted the:
 Dáil Constitution
 Message to the Free Nations of the World
 Democratic Programme

References

External links

Official texts from Wikisource:
Faisnéis Neamhspleádhchuis 
Irish Declaration of Independence (in English)
:fr:s:Déclaration d’Indépendance (Irlande) 

Ireland
History of the Republic of Ireland
History of Ireland (1801–1923)
1919 in Ireland
1919 documents